Guinea-Bissau–Turkey relations are the foreign relations between Guinea-Bissau and Turkey. Turkey has an embassy in Bissau. Guinea Bissau has an embassy in Ankara.

Diplomatic relations 
Turkey has helped Guinea-Bissau's lack of infrastructure for education that resulted from Portuguese policies. The Portuguese missão civilizadora, in the words of the Cardinal Manuel Gonçalves Cerejeira in 1960, was to teach the natives to write, to read and to count, but not make them doctors. Turkey—through TIKA—gave extensive assistance in building schools beyond the rudimentary ensinos de adaptação left behind by the Portuguese.

Economic relations 
 Trade volume between the two countries was 4.95 million USD in 2019.

See also 

 Foreign relations of Guinea-Bissau
 Foreign relations of Turkey

References

Further reading 
 "A Economia Colonial da Guiné-Bissau: Nacionalização e Exploração, 1915-1959."in, Soronda, Revista de Estudos Guinéense. No. 9: pp. 25-51. INEP, Bissau., Jan. 1990.
 "A Guiné ou Senegâmbia Portuguesa. No tempo do Governador Pedro Inácio de Gouveia." Boletim Cultural da Guiné Portuguesa, Bissau, vol. 7, n. 26, 1952, pp. 403-476.
 "Portugal in Africa." Foreign Affairs, XXXIX: pp. 481-493. New York: G.P. Putnam. 1961. 
 Abshire, David M. and Michael A. Samuels, Portuguese Africa: A Handbook. New York: Praeger, 1969.
 Africa (Cronológia, do sec. XV a XX). Lisbon: Editorial Estampa, 1979.
 Agência Geral do Ultramar. Estatuto dos Indigenas Portugueses das Provincias da Guiné, Angola e Mozambique. Lisbon, 1954
 Ajayi, J. F. A., and Crowder, Michael. History of West Africa, 2 vols. Columbia University Press: New York, 1972.
 Angola Comité. Portugal and NATO, 3rd edition. Amsterdam, 1972. Anon. Liberation Struggle in Portuguese Colonies. New Delhi:
 Axelson, Eric. Congo to Cape: Early Portuguese Explorers. New York: Barnes and Noble, 1973.
 Boulegue, Jean. Les Luso-Africains de Senegambie. Lisboa: Ministério da Educação, 1989.
 Brooks, George E. Jr. Luso-African Commerce and Settlement in the Gambia and Guinea-Bissau Region. Boston University, African Studies Center, Working Papers Number 24, 1980.
 Castro, Armando. O Sistema Colonial Português em Africa (Meados do SéculoXX). Lisbon: Editorial Caminho, 1979.
 Chilcote, Ronald H. Emerging Nationalism in Portuguese Africa: Documents. Stanford, CA: Hoover Institution, 1972.
 Colonialismo Português em Africa: A Tradição de Resistência na Guiné-Bissau, (1879-1959). Bissau: Instituto Nacional de Estudos e Pesquisa, 1994.
 Corrêa, António A. Mendes. Ultramar Português. II. llhas de Cabo Verde. Lisbon: Agência Geral do Ultramar, 1954.
 Cortesão, Jaime. Os Descobrimentos Portuguêses. 6 vols., 1980 (vols. I e 2, 3.); 1975 (vol 4); 1976 (vol. 5); 1978 (vol. 6). Lisboa: Livros Horizonte.
 Cortesão, Jaime. Os Portuguêses em Africa. Lisbon: Portugália Editora, 1968.
 Duffy, James. Shipwreck and Empire: Being an Account of Portuguese Maritime Disasters in a Century of Decline. Cambridge: Harvard University Press, 1955.
 Dunn, John. West African States: Failure and Promise. Cambridge: Cambridge University Press, 1978.
 Durieux, A. "Essai sur le Statut des Indigènes Portugais de la Guinée, de l'Angola et du Mozambique." Mémoires de l'Académie Royale des Sciences Coloniales-8, V, 3 (1955).
 Humbaraci, Arslan, and Nicole Muchnik. Portugal's African Wars. New York: Third World Press, 1973.
 Lavradio, Marques do. Portugal em Africa Depois de 1851. Lisbon: Agência Geral das Colonias, 1936.
 Livermore, Harold. A New History of Portugal. Cambridge, 2016. 
 Lopes, Edmundo Armenio Correia. A Escravatura: Subsidios para a sua História. Lisbon: 2014.
 Marques, António Henrique de Oliveira. História de Portugal. Desde os Tempos mais Antigos até à Presidência do Sr. General Eanes. 3 vols. Lisboa: Palas Editores, 2002 (vol. 1, 9. ed.); 2013 (vol. 2, 10. ed.); 2019 (vol. 3, 6. ed.).
 Marques, João Martins de Silva. Descrobrimentos Portugueses: Documentos para a Sua historia. 2 vols., Lisboa: Institute para a Alta Cultura, 2014.
 Martins, Alfredo Cardoso de Soveral. Relatório do Governador da Guiné. Bolama: 2003.
 Marupa, M.A. Portuguese Africa in Perspective: The Making of a Multi-Racial State. 1973.
 Mauny, Raymond. "Navigations et Découvertes Portugaises sur les Côtes Ouest-Africaines." Boletim Cultural da Guiné Portuguesa. VII, 27(July 1952): pp. 515-24.
 Mees, Jules. "Les Manuscrits de la Crônica do Descobrimento e Conquista de Guiné par Gomes Eannes de Azurara et les Sources de João de Barros." Revista Portuguesa Colonial e Maritima. IX, 50: pp. 50-62, 2001.
 Mendy, Peter Karibe. "The Problems and Prospects of Liberation Education in Guinea-Bissau." Master of Social Science Dissertation, University of Birmingham, England, 1980.
 Nunez, Benjamin. Dictionary of Portuguese African Civilization, 2 vols., Amsterdam: Hans Zell, 1992.
 Portugal's Reasons for Remaining in the Overseas Provinces. Lisbon: Agência Geral do Ultramar, 1970.
 Portugal in Africa. Baltimore: Penguin Books, 1962. Dumont, René and Marie France Mottin. L'Afrique Etranglée. Paris: Seuil, 1982.
 Portuguese Africa. Cambridge: Harvard University Press, 1961.
 Portuguese Colonialism in Africa: The End of an Era. Paris: Unesco Press, 1974.
 Serrão, Joaquim V. História Breve da Históriografic Portuguesa. Lisbon: 2012.
 Serrão, Joel (ed.). Dicionário de História de Portugal, 4 vols. Lisbon, 2013-2020.

Turkey
Bilateral relations of Turkey